Angela Rinicella (born 7 May 1982) is a former Italian female long-distance runner and cross-country runner who competed at individual senior level at the World Athletics Cross Country Championships (2003, 2005, 2006).

Biography
She was born in Altofonte near Palermo, Sicily as the silver Olympic medal Salvatore Antibo. Rinicella was 10th in 10,000 m at the 2005 Mediterranean Games.

National titles
She won a national championship at individual senior level.
Italian Cross Country Championships
Short race: 2006

References

External links
 
 Angela Rinicella at Association of Road Racing Statisticians

1982 births
Living people
Italian female long-distance runners
Italian female cross country runners
Sportspeople from the Province of Palermo
Athletics competitors of Gruppo Sportivo Esercito
People from Altofonte
Athletes (track and field) at the 2005 Mediterranean Games
Mediterranean Games competitors for Italy